Nadezhda Davydovna Tokayeva (born 27 September 1957) is a Kazakh public figure, who was the First Lady of Kazakhstan from 2019 to 2020, as the former wife of Kassym-Jomart Tokayev.

Early life and education
Her father and mother are from an Ashkenazi Jewish family (of Soviet-Jewish descent). An ethnic Ashkenazi Jew, Tokayeva was born in Nizhny Tagil in Russia's Sverdlovsk Oblast.
She graduated from the Moscow State Institute for History and Archives.

Career
From 2011 to 2012 she was the honorary president of the United Nations Women's Guild in Geneva.

In March 2019, she assumed the role of first lady when her husband’s predecessor, Nursultan Nazarbayev, resigned after 29 years in power.

Personal life
Tokayeva is divorced from Kassym-Jomart Tokayev. Together with her husband, she has a son, Timur (born 15 February 1984) and Manira (born 7 October 1987).

In 1998, she and her son Timur opened a Credit Suisse bank account, even though she qualified as a politically exposed person, which at its height in 2005 contained 1.5 million US$. After her husband became director-general of the United Nations’ Geneva office, the account was closed in 2012, and the family opened offshore companies in the British Virgin Islands, with $5 million in assets plus properties in Geneva and Moscow at $7.7 million.

See also
Suisse secrets

References

Links 
 Photo 

1957 births
Living people
First ladies of Kazakhstan
Kazakhstani people of Russian descent
Kazakhstani people of Jewish descent
People from Nizhny Tagil